The 1998 Eisenhower Trophy took place 19 to 22 November at Club de Golf Los Leones and Club de Golf La Dehesa in Santiago, Chile. It was the 21st World Amateur Team Championship for the Eisenhower Trophy. The tournament was a 72-hole stroke play team event with 52 four-man teams. The best three scores for each round counted towards the team total. Each team played two rounds on the two courses. The leading teams played at Club de Golf La Dehesa on the third day and at Club de Golf Los Leones on the final day.

Great Britain and Ireland won the Eisenhower Trophy for the fourth time, finishing four strokes ahead of the silver medalists, Australia. Chinese Taipei took the bronze medal with Japan in fourth place. Finland led after three rounds but a poor last round dropped then into fifth place. Kim Felton, representing Australia, had the lowest individual score, 11-under-par 275, two strokes better than Mikko Ilonen.

Teams
52 four-man teams contested the event.

The following table lists the players on the leading teams.

Scores

Source:

Individual leaders
There was no official recognition for the lowest individual scores.

Source:

References

External links
Record Book on International Golf Federation website 

Eisenhower Trophy
Golf tournaments in Chile
Eisenhower Trophy
Eisenhower Trophy
Eisenhower Trophy